The 1955–56 UCLA Bruins men's basketball team represented the University of California, Los Angeles during the 1955–56 NCAA men's basketball season and were members of the Pacific Coast Conference. The Bruins were led by eight year head coach John Wooden. They finished the regular season with a record of 22–6 and won the PCC regular season championship with a record of 16–0. The victory over Seattle was UCLA's first victory in the NCAA tournament.

Previous season

The Bruins finished the regular season with a record of 21–5 and won the PCC Southern Division with a record of 11–1.

Roster

Schedule

|-
!colspan=9 style=|Regular Season

|-
!colspan=12 style="background:#;"| NCAA tournament

Source

Rankings

References

UCLA Bruins men's basketball seasons
Ucla
UCLA
UCLA Bruins Basketball
UCLA Bruins Basketball